The Maj. Isaac C. Elston House, also known as Elston Homestead, is a historic home located at Crawfordsville, Montgomery County, Indiana. It was the home of Maj. Isaac Compton Elston, who fought in the War of 1812 and the Black Hawk War.  When he was 39, he moved to Indiana and became a frontier merchant, banker and financier.  The Home was given to Wabash College by his grandson, Isaac Compton Elston, Jr. (1873-1964) and is now used as the President's home.

It was listed on the National Register of Historic Places in 1982. It is located in the Elston Grove Historic District.

References

External links
Wabash College entry on building

Houses on the National Register of Historic Places in Indiana
Houses completed in 1882
Queen Anne architecture in Indiana
Houses in Montgomery County, Indiana
National Register of Historic Places in Montgomery County, Indiana
Historic district contributing properties in Indiana
Crawfordsville, Indiana